Hermaion  or Hermaion was an inland town in ancient Mysia., located in what is now modern-day Turkey. It was a significant city in the region, known for its strategic location and rich cultural heritage.

Its site is located near Çınardere, Turkey.

In ancient times, Hermaion was a hub of commerce and trade, connecting the interior regions of Mysia with the coastal cities and ports. Its location along important trade routes made it a prosperous city, and it was known for its markets and bazaars, as well as its skilled artisans and craftsmen.

Hermaion was also a cultural center, home to several notable temples and shrines dedicated to the worship of the gods. These religious sites were important centers of worship and pilgrimage, attracting visitors from all over the ancient world.

Despite its importance, the ancient city of Hermaion has largely been forgotten over time, and today, little remains of its once-thriving civilization. However, the city's rich cultural heritage continues to be remembered and celebrated by historians and scholars, who have worked to uncover the story of this ancient inland town in Mysia.

References

Populated places in ancient Mysia
Former populated places in Turkey